Herculez Gomez (born April 6, 1982) is an American former professional soccer player who played as a forward. He currently works as a commentator in both English and Spanish for ESPN.

Early life
Gomez, the oldest of five children, was born in Oxnard, California to Mexican-American parents. He grew up in Las Vegas, Nevada, and played on the soccer team at Las Vegas High School.

Club career

Early career
Gomez started his career in 2001 with Cruz Azul of the Mexican Primera División on their second-division squad, and transferred to second-division team Aguilas Blancas de Puebla later that year. The following season, he returned to the Primera División with Durango. However, playing opportunities were scarce for him there. The Los Angeles Galaxy staff noticed him during a friendly match and he joined the team in September.

MLS
Gomez broke his foot while on loan to the Seattle Sounders of the United Soccer Leagues, and recovery took a long time. When he was able to play again, he joined the San Diego Sockers of the Major Indoor Soccer League. He returned to the Galaxy for the 2005 season on a developmental contract, but played well enough to make it to the first team. His big chance came when Landon Donovan was called up to the national team. Donovan's absence gave Gomez many more starts at striker, and he was able to shine as a breakout goal-scorer.

He scored the game-winning goal in the 2005 Lamar Hunt U.S. Open Cup Final, then helped the Galaxy to a rare Cup 'double' when they also won the 2005 MLS Cup. Gomez ended the 2005 season with eighteen goals scored for the Galaxy (in all matches), and was voted by the local L.A. media as the year's Most Valuable Player.

Early in the 2006 season, Gomez was moved to the bench with then-coach Steve Sampson. Sampson used Gomez as a midfielder to see if he could score goals running at defenses. After Sampson's firing, however, Gomez scored several times under new coach Frank Yallop, and ended that season with five goals.

In December 2006, Gomez was traded to the Colorado Rapids along with Ugo Ihemelu in exchange for Joe Cannon. He scored the first goal in the history of Dick's Sporting Goods Park in his first game for Colorado, a 2-1 win over D.C. United on April 7, 2007. Gomez tore his ACL during training with the Rapids in September of that year and was forced to undergo a lengthy recovery process.

Gomez was traded to Kansas City Wizards in exchange for allocation money, a fourth round 2009 MLS SuperDraft pick and a first round 2009 MLS Supplemental Draft pick in September 2008. His only goal for the Wizards was an injury time winner against San Jose Earthquakes, a must win game in their 2008 play-offs push.

Mexico

After being released by Kansas City in late 2009, Gomez signed with Mexican club Puebla in January 2010. He scored ten goals in the 2010 Mexican season to tie for the lead for most goals; this feat marked the first time any American player led a foreign league in goals. He moved to Pachuca in the summer 2010 window.

Pachuca placed Gomez, along with its entire squad, on the transfer list.  During the transfer window he moved along with teammate Braulio Luna to Estudiantes Tecos. Gomez scored his first goal for his new club in the second game of the Mexico Apertura season, coming in a 2-1 loss to San Luis.  On August 19, Gomez scored the winner as a sub against his former club Pachuca.

Cash-strapped Estudiantes Tecos were forced into selling Gomez to league rivals Santos Laguna in December 2011. Gomez scored 11 goals in his first 12 appearances for the team across all competitions.

With Santos Laguna's 2012 Clausura victory, Gomez became the first player to have won both the MLS Cup and the Primera División championship. In 2013, he moved to Club Tijuana. After struggling with Tijuana, he was loaned to Tigres UANL for the 2014–15 season. However, he ended the season poorly with only one goal. His loan was not extended.

Return to MLS
In August 2015, Gomez joined Toronto FC.

After his release from Toronto at the beginning of the 2016 MLS season, Gomez joined Seattle Sounders FC. He won MLS Cup for the second time in his career. He retired following the season and joined ESPN as an analyst.

International career
Gomez was named to the United States roster for the 2007 Copa America and earned his first cap as a second-half substitute against Argentina, with his first start coming against Colombia.

After a lengthy absence from the national team, Gomez was named to the provisional 30-man U.S. squad for the 2010 FIFA World Cup after a highly productive club season in Mexico. He scored a goal for the U.S. national team in a 4–2 friendly defeat to the Czech Republic on May 25; the next day he was named to the final 23-man squad. Gomez played in 3 out of the 4 games for the United States at the World Cup, including the round of 16 game against Ghana.

Gomez made his return to the national team in 2012, appearing in friendlies against Scotland and Brazil and scoring a goal against the latter. Later in 2012, he scored goals in World Cup qualifying against Antigua and Barbuda and Jamaica

His last national team appearance came during the 2013 CONCACAF Gold Cup.

Broadcaster
In January 2017, Gomez announced his retirement from professional soccer, and joined the broadcasting team at ESPN. He typically appears as a studio analyst / pundit for ESPN FC, MLS games, and US National Team games. Also, he is the co-host of several podcasts, most notably the Max and Herc podcast with Max Bretos, where they discuss news around Major League Soccer and the United States national soccer team, and the Two on Tri podcast with Sebastian Salazar, where they discuss the Liga MX, the Mexico national football team, and Mexican players abroad.

He and Salazar also host "Fútbol Americas" on ESPN+.

Personal life
Herculez is the brother of MMA fighter Ulysses Gomez.

Career statistics

Club

International

Honors
LA Galaxy
MLS Cup: 2005
U.S. Open Cup: 2005
Major League Soccer Western Conference Championship: 2005

Santos Laguna
Mexican Primera División: Clausura 2012

Puebla
Copa MX: Clausura 2015

Seattle Sounders FC
MLS Cup: 2016

United States
CONCACAF Gold Cup: 2013

Individual
U.S. Open Cup Top scorer (Shared): 2005
Liga MX Golden Boot (Shared): Bicentenario 2010
Copa MX Top scorer (Shared): Clausura 2015

References

External links

 
 
 
 
 
 
 

1982 births
Living people
American soccer players
American sportspeople of Mexican descent
CONCACAF Gold Cup-winning players
2007 Copa América players
2010 FIFA World Cup players
2013 CONCACAF Gold Cup players
American expatriate soccer players
Soccer players from Nevada
United States men's international soccer players
LA Galaxy players
Toronto FC players
Colorado Rapids players
Seattle Sounders FC players
Sporting Kansas City players
Seattle Sounders (1994–2008) players
Club Puebla players
C.F. Pachuca players
Tecos F.C. footballers
Santos Laguna footballers
Club Tijuana footballers
Tigres UANL footballers
USL League Two players
A-League (1995–2004) players
Major League Soccer players
Major Indoor Soccer League (2001–2008) players
Liga MX players
San Diego Gauchos players
Expatriate footballers in Mexico
American expatriate sportspeople in Mexico
Association football forwards
Las Vegas High School alumni